North & South is a New Zealand monthly national current affairs magazine, specialising in long-form investigative stories and photojournalism. In an eight-page article in 2015, for example, "Long Walk to Justice", staff writer Mike White asked if New Zealand’s justice system should establish an independent commission to investigate wrongful convictions. Issues involving justice in New Zealand provide a theme for many of his stories for North & South. The editorial content also includes profiles of New Zealanders, brief stories, essays, opinion, music, film and book reviews, food, and travel.

History and profile
North & South was launched in April 1986 by Metro Publications – Mick Mason and Bruce Palmer, under editor Robyn Langwell. ACP Magazines then sold to ACP. It is now published by Bauer Media NZ, based in Auckland. Bauer Media NZ acquired the title in September 2012. Virginia Larson succeeded Robyn Langwell as editor in 2008 until 2020.

The magazine has won more than 300 journalism, photography and design awards, including multiple MPA Magazine of the Year awards, Citi Journalism Awards for Excellence and Wolfson Fellowships to the University of Cambridge, United Kingdom.

In early April 2020, the Bauer Media Group closed down several of its New Zealand brands including North & South in response to the economic downturn caused by the COVID-19 pandemic in New Zealand.

On 17 June 2020, Sydney investment firm Mercury Capital purchased North and South as part of its acquisition of Bauer Media's New Zealand and Australian media assets. On 17 July, Mercury Capital confirmed that it would be selling North and South to independent publishers Konstantin Richter and Verena Friederike Hasel.

Contribution to press freedom 
In 1995, North & South published an article by Joe Atkinson in which he called ex-Prime Minister David Lange lazy. Lange objected to this and other criticisms in the article, and sued Atkinson and the publishers for defamation. The subsequent case ran for five years, and resulted in the media being able to use a defence of qualified privilege when reporting on politicians. This was a ground-breaking extension of press freedom, which was subsequently subsumed in a more general defence of public interest communication.

Controversy
In November 2006, Deborah Coddington wrote a cover article, "Asian Angst", questioning immigration and referencing the high profile of "Asian" crime, talking of a "gathering crime tide" and an "Asian menace". Coddington's article attempted to justify this language by pointing to a 53% increase in police arrest figures for "Asians" over the last 10 years. However, she neglected to mention that the corresponding overall "Asian" population had increased by more than 100% in that time and that the arrest rate among that "Asian" population (which was already very low compared to the general population) had halved. A member of the general population was now four times more likely to be arrested than an "Asian".

Outraged reaction swiftly followed, and formal complaints to New Zealand Press Council came from the Asia New Zealand Foundation, the head of Journalism at Massey University and a consortium of mostly academics, journalists and ethnic Asian community leaders led by Tze Ming Mok.

The following month, the New Zealand Press Council condemned Coddington's article and ordered North & South to print an apology.

The Press Council found the language of the article "misleading" and "emotionally loaded". The Council stated that even though journalists are "entitled to take a strong position on issues they address ... that does not legitimise gratuitous emphasis on dehumanising racial stereotypes and fear-mongering and, of course, the need for accuracy always remains".

Coddington called the New Zealand Press Council's decision "pathetic".

Columnists and staff writers

A number of prominent New Zealand journalists have written for North and South. These include:

Gallery

References

External links
Bauer Media

1986 establishments in New Zealand
2020 disestablishments in New Zealand
ACP magazine titles
Magazines established in 1986
Monthly magazines published in New Zealand
News magazines published in New Zealand
Mass media in Auckland